Alberta is one of the thirteen provinces and territories of Canada. The southern half of the province borders British Columbia along the Continental Divide of the Americas on the peaks of the Rocky Mountains, while the northern half borders British Columbia along the 120th meridian west. Along with Saskatchewan it is one of only two landlocked provinces or territories.

Terrain

Alberta's landscape is marked by the impact of the Wisconsin Glaciation, about 75,000 to 11,000 years ago, when the entire future province was covered in ice. As the ice sheet receded, the landscape was changed, and large amounts of glacial till were left behind.

The southern portion consists chiefly of plains that are almost entirely treeless. As the slopes of the Rocky Mountains to the west are reached, more trees are found until in the foothills of the mountains, bodies of forest timber occur. Trees also become more numerous in the northern part of the province, until in the region north of the North Saskatchewan River continuous forests are met with again. From the southern boundary line for 2.5° north the prairie is dry, but of good soil, which grows excellent crops when irrigated. North of this region, the surface of the province is of the most fertile soil, with ordinary rainfall sufficing for agriculture. Alberta also has large oil reserves, especially in the Athabasca oil sands in the north of the province.

The appearance of the prairie section of the province is that of undulating grasslands, with rounded sloping ridges covered with shorter grasses, which serve for the support of large herds of beef cattle. The wooded portions of the terrain are dotted with clumps and belts of trees of moderate size, giving them a park-like appearance. In winter it is generally very cold, but this is occasionally reduced by a warm wind from the west, known as the Chinook.

In 1986, Agriculture Canada published a map listing the following physiographic regions to be present at least partially within Alberta:

Canadian Shield
Kazan Upland
Athabasca Plain
Interior Plains
Northern Plains
Saskatchewan Plains
Northern Alberta Lowlands
Eastern Alberta Plains
Western Alberta Plains
Northern Alberta Uplands
Southern Alberta Uplands
Cordilleran Region
Rocky Mountain Foothills
Rocky Mountains

Mountains

From a distance of about  the mountains are constantly in view in clear weather. They appear as a line of snowy peaks along the western horizon. This continues for hundreds of kilometres northwestward. The Canadian Rockies are ascended by a gradual approach from the east, but are exceedingly abrupt on their transalpine slope in British Columbia. Among the more notable of these are:

Mount Columbia - 
Twin Peaks massif - 
Mount Alberta - 
Mount Forbes - 
Mount Temple - 
Mount Brazeau - 
Snow Dome - 
Mount Lyell - 
Mount Kitchener - 
Mount Hungabee - 

Historical travelling through these mountains was difficult, and alpine passes became very important. The most noted of the Alberta passes are:

 The Crowsnest Pass, near the southern boundary line, through which a branch of the Canadian Pacific Railway runs.
 The Kicking Horse Pass, through which the main line of the Canadian Pacific Railway was built;  from the eastern end of this pass is the gate of Banff National Park, with the famous touristic town of Banff as its centre.
 The Yellowhead Pass, running west from the Athabasca River; this pass was discovered by John Palliser (1858), was crossed by the first tourists, William Wentworth-Fitzwilliam, Viscount Milton and Walter Butler Cheadle, in 1861, and by Sandford Fleming (1871–1872) in the Ocean to Ocean expedition;

The Caribou Mountains are not part of the Canadian Rockies, but are located in the northern Alberta, constituting an elevated plateau in the northern plains.

While not considered mountains, the Cypress Hills, located in southern Alberta, on the Saskatchewan border, constitutes the highest point between the Rocky Mountains and Labrador.

Water

With the exception of the southern section, the province of Alberta is well watered. Running eastward these two rivers unite about 112° west, and flow on under the name of the South Saskatchewan River. North of 52° north many small streams unite to form the Red Deer River, which flowing southeastward joins the South Saskatchewan near 110° west. Between 52° and 53° north rises the great river, the North Saskatchewan River. It receives a southern tributary, the Battle River, which joins it about 108° west. Pursuing their courses eastward the North and South Saskatchewan rivers unite in the Saskatchewan River ("swift flowing river"), which finds its way to Lake Winnipeg, and thence by way of Nelson River to Hudson Bay. It is one of the mightiest rivers of the continent.

At Mount Athabasca, there is an unusual occurrence where the water flows either to the Pacific Ocean on the western slope, the Arctic Ocean on the northeast, and Hudson Bay on the southeast.

In the northern part of the province, between 53° and 54° north, all the waters of Alberta flow toward the Arctic Ocean. Starting at Mount Athabasca, the Athabasca River runs north and empties into Lake Athabasca near 58° north. North of 56° north flows through and from the Rocky Mountains as the Peace River. After descending northeastward to within a few miles of Lake Athabasca, it is met by a stream emerging from that lake. The united river carrying down the waters of the Athabasca slope is called the Slave River, which, passing through Great Slave Lake, emerges as the great Mackenzie River, which flows into the Arctic Ocean. Alberta thus gives rise to the two great rivers, the Saskatchewan and the Mackenzie.

These are Lake Athabasca,  in extent, of which the greater part is in Saskatchewan, and the other Lesser Slave Lake  in area.

Climate

It is also further influenced by the different altitudes found in the province.

In general, Alberta's climate is dry, due to the rain shadow effect of the Rocky Mountains and Pacific Coast Ranges to the west, and continental, due to its distance from any large body of water. The contrast between warming, dry winds descending from the Rockies and proximate cold air in Yukon, however, gives Alberta (and the adjacent Mackenzie Basin) during the winter the highest variability in monthly temperatures anywhere in the world. Exceptionally warm winter months in the province can be as warm as oceanic climates at similar latitudes – for instance Edmonton averaged  in February 1977 – whereas the coldest winter months like January 1950 when Edmonton averaged  are comparably cold to such Siberian localities as Aldan, Sakha.

Southern Alberta
Most of Southern Alberta east of the Rockies and outside of the Cypress Hills, especially Palliser's Triangle, is a dry steppe, with most locations having an annual average precipitation of 280-430mm. Under the Köppen climate classification, most places in Southern Alberta are either semi-arid (Köppen climate classification BSk), or humid continental (Köppen climate classification Dfb) (the "humid" designation denotes that these climates do not meet the criteria to be semi-arid, not that they necessarily have high humidity levels). Most places in Southern Alberta that fall under the "humid continental" classification are close to the borderline between semi-arid and humid continental. This region has the hottest summer temperatures in Alberta and quite cold winters, though chinook winds ameliorate the cold winter temperatures temporarily when they pass over. The natural vegetation of this region is mainly dry mixed grass prairie, grading to mixed grass prairie, and then fescue prairie as precipitation increases with higher altitude and / or latitude. This area is prone to drought and farming here is not successful without significant irrigation.

Central Alberta
Central Alberta has a dry continental climate, with most places falling under the humid continental classification (Köppen climate classification Dfb), though some areas in the southeast of this region, close to the border with Saskatchewan around Oyen, are semi-arid (Köppen BSk). Precipitation levels here are generally higher than in Southern Alberta, though the driest areas of Alberta, around Empress, are in Central Alberta. This region generally has cooler temperatures than Southern Alberta in both summer and winter, due to the decreased amount of solar radiation received, and the lower frequency of chinooks blowing through the region. After Southern Ontario, Central Alberta is the region in Canada most likely to experience tornadoes. Most of Central Alberta is covered by aspen parkland, but the driest areas have mixedgrass and even dry mixed grass prairie, while the wetter and/or cooler areas are covered in mixed boreal forest. The wetter parts of this region, around Edmonton, have some of the most fertile land in the Canadian Prairies.

Northern Alberta
Northern Alberta is the coldest region of Alberta, with most places having a subarctic climate (Köppen climate classification Dfc) though some areas in the south of this region, as well as much of the Peace River Country, have a humid continental climate (Köppen climate classification Dfb). Winters in Northern Alberta are long, and  cold, while summers are short and warm. Precipitation levels are generally lower than Central Alberta and similar to Southern Alberta, but lower evapotranspiration results in there being greater effective precipitation than Southern Alberta. Natural vegetation in Northern Alberta consists primarily of mixed and coniferous taiga, with aspen parkland in the Peace River Country. With the exception of the Peace River Country, this region is generally quite poor for agriculture.

Rocky Mountains and Cypress Hills
Lower elevations of the Rocky Mountains and all but the highest elevations of the Cypress Hills have a humid continental climate (Köppen climate classification Dfb). These areas have snowy but mild winters due to the warming effect of chinook winds, and cool summers due to their high elevation. As altitude increases and the subalpine zone is reached, this grades into a subarctic climate (Köppen climate classification Dfc), with harsher winters and even cooler summers. Above the tree line, an alpine climate (Köppen climate classification ETH) prevails. Conditions this high are even colder and very windy. Precipitation is higher in these elevated regions than elsewhere in Alberta, and this supports forests of lodgepole pine and trembling aspen mixed with fescue grasslands in the montane areas, Engelmann spruce and subalpine fir forests in the subalpine zone, and heather, sedges and mountain avens in the alpine zone above the tree lines.

Ecology

Lists of ecological regions and zones 
According to the provincial government's Natural Regions Committee, the following natural regions and subregions are found in Alberta:
 Rocky Mountains
Alpine
Subalpine
Montane
Foothills
Upper Foothills
Lower Foothills
Grassland
Dry Mixedgrass
Mixedgrass
Northern Fescue
Foothills Fescue
Parkland
Foothills Parkland
Central Parkland
Peace River Parkland
Boreal Forest
Dry Mixedwood
 Central Mixedwood
 Lower Boreal Highlands
 Upper Boreal Highlands
 Athabasca Plain
 Peace–Athabasca Delta
 Northern Mixedwood
 Boreal Subarctic
 Canadian Shield
 Kazan Upland

According to the Commission for Environmental Cooperation and Environment and Climate Change Canada, the following Canadian ecozones are found in Alberta:
 Boreal Plains Ecozone (CEC)
 Boreal Shield Ecozone (CEC)
 Montane Cordillera Ecozone (CEC)
 Prairies Ecozone
 Taiga Plains Ecozone (CEC)
 Taiga Shield Ecozone (CEC)

According to the World Wide Fund for Nature, the following Canadian ecoregions are found in Alberta:
 Alberta Mountain forests
 Alberta–British Columbia foothills forests
 Canadian aspen forests and parklands
 North Central Rockies forests
 Northern mixed grasslands
 Northern short grasslands
 Mid-Continental Canadian forests
 Montana valley and foothill grasslands
 Muskwa–Slave Lake forests

See also

Geography of Canada
Glacial Lake Bassano

References

External links
Government of Alberta: Climate and Geography
 Alberta Parks Natural Regions and Subregions of Alberta